Pilgrim is the surname of:

 Agnes Baker Pilgrim (1924–2019), Native American spiritual elder
 Guy Ellcock Pilgrim (1875–1943), British geologist and palaeontologist
 Jane Pilgrim, English trade union organiser
 Janet Pilgrim (British Army officer) (born c. 1966), nurse
 Janet Pilgrim (model) (1934–2017), three-time Playboy Playmate of the Month
 Jim Pilgrim (1874–1939), English footballer 
 Mark Pilgrim (born 1972), American software developer
 Mark Pilgrim (presenter) (1969–2023), South African radio and television presenter
 Paul Pilgrim (1883–1958), American runner
 Peace Pilgrim (1908–1981), American pacifist
 Steve Pilgrim (born 1967), English rugby player